Jeanne Pruett is a studio album by American country music artist Jeanne Pruett. It was released in June 1974 on MCA Records and was produced by Walter Haynes. It was Pruett's third studio album issued in her recording career. The project was also one of two eponymous studio albums she released in her career.

The album consists of 11 tracks, two of which were released as singles and became major hits.

Background and content
Jeanne Pruett was recorded in 1974 at Bradley's Barn, a studio located in Mount Juliet, Tennessee. The sessions were produced by Walter Haynes. It was Pruett's third production assignment with Haynes. The album was a collection of 11 tracks. Four of the album's tracks were written by Pruett herself. Among the self-penned songs was a remake of her 1971 single "Hold on to My Unchanging Love". The eponymous release also featured songs written by established country music songwriters. This included Bobby Braddock and Curly Putman, who wrote the track "Come to Me". The album also included a cover version of Don Williams' "Lay Down Beside Me". In later years, the song would become a major hit for Williams.

Release and reception

Jeanne Pruett was released in June 1974 on MCA Records, becoming her third studio recording. It was issued as a vinyl LP, with five songs featured on "side one" and six songs featured on "side two" of the record. Upon its release, the album debuted on the Billboard Top Country Albums chart and spent 15 weeks on it before reaching number 19 in August 1974. The eponymous release was reviewed positively by Billboard magazine in 1974, praising her self-written material. "To say she gets better with each release is an understatement. This marvelous singer has done a phenomenal job with the entire album, but the best cuts are those she has done from her own pen," staff writers wrote.

The album included two singles that became major hits between 1973 and 1974. The first to be released was "I'm Your Woman" in August 1973. The song became Pruett's second major hit, reaching number eight on the Billboard Hot Country Singles chart. It also became a major hit on the Canadian RPM Country Singles chart, reaching number eight as well. The second and final single released was "You Don't Need to Move a Mountain" in February 1974. Spending 14 weeks on the Hot Country Singles chart, it peaked at number 15 in May. It also made a chart appearance on the RPM country chart, reaching only number 34.

Track listing

Personnel
All credits are adapted from the liner notes of Jeanne Pruett.

Musical personnel

 Harold Bradley – guitar
 Winnie Breast – background vocals
 David Briggs – piano
 Dorothy Deleonibus – background vocals
 Ray Edenton – guitar
 Lloyd Green – steel guitar
 Buddy Harman – drums
 The Jordanaires – background vocals
 Millie Kirkham – background vocals
 Mike Leech – bass
 Kenny Malone – drums

 Bob Moore – bass
 Laverna Moore – background vocals
 Grady Martin – guitar
 Jeanne Pruett – lead vocals, background vocals
 Hargus "Pig" Robbins – piano
 Troy Seals – guitar
 Jerry Smith – piano
 Pete Wade – guitar
 Ernest West – background vocals
 Reggie Young – guitar

Technical personnel
 Bobby Bradley – engineering
 Walter Haynes – producer
 Darrell Johnson – mastering
 Joe Mills – mixing, engineering
 Jeanne Pruett – liner notes
 Dan Quest and Associates – cover photo

Chart performance

Release history

References

1974 albums
Jeanne Pruett albums
MCA Records albums